The 1983 Budweiser Trans-Am Championship was the eighteenth running of the Sports Car Club of America's premier series.

Results

Championships

Drivers
David Hobbs – 158 points
Willy T Ribbs – 148 points
Tom Gloy – 143 points
Elliott Forbes-Robinson – 102 points
Frank Leary – 79 points

References

Trans-Am Series
Trans-Am